The 1999 Italian Open doubles was the doubles event of the fifty-fifth edition of the tennis tournament played at Rome, Italy, the most prestigious tennis tournament in Southern Europe. It was the fifth WTA Tier I tournament of the year, and part of the European claycourt season. Virginia Ruano Pascual and Paola Suárez were the defending champions, but lost to Martina Hingis and Anna Kournikova in the quarterfinals.

Hingis and Kournikova won this tournament by defeating Alexandra Fusai and Nathalie Tauziat in the final.

Seeds
The top four seeds received a bye into the second round.

Draw

Finals

Top half

Bottom half

Qualifying

Seeds

Qualifiers
  Larissa Schaerer /  Magüi Serna

Lucky losers
  Jana Kandarr /  Samantha Reeves

Qualifying draw

External links
 1999 Italian Open Women's Doubles draw

Women's Doubles
Italian Open